Třebětice may refer to:

 Třebětice (Jindřichův Hradec District), a village in the Czech Republic
 Třebětice (Kroměříž District), a village in the Czech Republic